KERA-TV (channel 13) is a PBS member television station licensed to Dallas, Texas, United States, serving the Dallas–Fort Worth Metroplex. Owned by North Texas Public Broadcasting, Inc., it is sister to NPR member station KERA (90.1 FM), adult album alternative station KKXT (91.7 FM), and classical music station WRR (101.1 FM, which is operated under a management services agreement with the City of Dallas). The stations share studios on Harry Hines Boulevard, while KERA-TV's transmitter is located in Cedar Hill, Texas.

The station's signal is relayed on low-power translator station K26NK-D in Wichita Falls, which provides PBS programming to the Texas side of the Wichita Falls–Lawton market.

KERA-TV also serves as the default PBS member station for several markets in North and West Texas that do not have a locally based PBS member station, including Abilene, San Angelo and the Tyler–Longview–Lufkin–Nacogdoches DMA, as well as the Texas side of the Sherman–Ada market. KERA is also available on cable in Hillsboro, Waco and Texarkana.

History
The VHF channel 13 allocation in the Dallas–Fort Worth market—which the Federal Communications Commission (FCC) reserved for non-commercial educational use in its list of frequencies assigned for broadcast television transmissions—was originally applied for use by Southern Methodist University in the late 1950s; however, the university had trouble raising enough funds for its planned educational station's start-up, programming and operational costs.

In 1958, the Dallas Independent School District (DISD) partnered with local nonprofit corporation Area Education Television Foundation, Inc. (which later evolved into North Texas Public Broadcasting) to apply for the allocation. In October of that year, W. T. White, then-superintendent of the DISD, announced that the station was slated to sign on the air by the beginning of the 1959–60 school year; programming on channel 13 was scheduled to include Spanish-language instructional programming for area elementary school students. The foundation had difficulty in meeting its fundraising goals to obtain start-up costs for the commencement of operations and broadcasts of its educational station; by May 1959, the foundation was said to be $265,000 short of its $890,000 target to cover the proposed station's first two years of broadcasting.

The original license application filed by the organization-school district partnership had obtained permission from the FCC to operate the station from broadcast facilities located in Fair Park (on land donated to Area Educational Television Foundation and the DISD by the Dallas city government). However, in January 1960, the partnership applied for permission to broadcast from studios on Harry Hines Boulevard that were set to be vacated by ABC affiliate WFAA-TV (channel 8), which had been used by that station since its sign-on (as DuMont-Paramount affiliate KBTV) in September 1949. A. H. Belo Corporation was in the process of building new studio facilities at Young and Houston Streets to accommodate the operations of local newspaper The Dallas Morning News, WFAA television and its companion radio stations (570 AM, now KLIF and 97.9 FM, now KBFB; the latter of which ironically once held the KERA-FM call letters now used by KERA-TV's sister radio station on 90.1 FM). The Dallas Independent School District purchased the building on Harry Hines for $400,000.

KERA-TV (the call letters are said to represent a "new era in broadcasting") signed on the air on September 14, 1960, originally serving as a member station of National Educational Television (NET). It originally operated from temporary studio facilities at the Davis Building—located behind the original WFAA studios—in downtown Dallas, in two portable buildings that were made to resemble a schoolhouse. It also used the original transmission tower used by WFAA-TV from 1960 to 1971, before moving its transmitter to a tower in Cedar Hill owned by then-independent station KTVT (channel 11, now a CBS owned-and-operated station) until 2009, when KTVT moved its transmitter to a different tower site a short distance away. However, KERA's transmitter only produced a medium-power signal that covered Dallas and surrounding suburbs in Dallas, Collin, Hunt, Rockwall, Ellis and Kaufman counties. The station would migrate its operations to the Harry Hines Boulevard facility in April 1961.

During its first years of operation, KERA benefitted frequently through help from commercial broadcast stations in the Metroplex. The Dallas Independent School District also paid the station to carry instructional telecourses that it would produce for broadcast on channel 13. The issues concerning channel 13's limited signal range would be resolved on August 31, 1970, when a new transmitter was installed that expanded KERA's signal coverage into Fort Worth and surrounding communities in Tarrant, Denton, Wise, Parker, Hood and Johnson counties. That same year, KERA became a member station of the Public Broadcasting Service (PBS), which was launched as an independent entity to supersede NET and took over many of the functions of its predecessor network.

In 1974, KERA gained a sister station on radio, when National Public Radio station KERA signed on the air on 90.1 FM; over time, KERA radio would expand its reach throughout North Texas through the launch of translators in Wichita Falls, Tyler and Sherman. That year, channel 13 became the first television station in the United States to broadcast episodes of Monty Python's Flying Circus; the station is often credited with introducing the British comedy series to American audiences, which eventually gave Flying Circus a cult following.

On September 1, 1988, North Texas Public Broadcasting signed on KDTN (channel 2) in Denton to serve as the market's secondary PBS member station, a project which the organization had been working on since May 1977, when it filed an FCC application for a construction permit to build an educational station on VHF channel 2 (North Texas Public Broadcasting would reach an agreement with its lone remaining competitor for the permit in 1984 to obtain the permit). The organization primarily used KDTN to run educational and instructional programs that had previously filled much of KERA's daytime schedule, along with carrying some programs produced by the University of North Texas (the KDTN studio facility was based on the university's campus). At that time, KERA shifted its schedule to offering primarily entertainment programming from PBS and other public television program distributors such as American Public Television; channel 13 also identified Denton as part of the station's service area in station identifications during the period it operated KDTN.

After making the decision to divest the secondary outlet on the basis that its funding was no longer sufficient to continue operating two television stations in the Metroplex, North Texas Public Broadcasting sold KDTN to religious broadcaster Daystar—which bought the station in a $20 million deal in order to get a better signal in the market to replace its original flagship, KMPX (channel 29, now an Estrella TV affiliate), which it sold in turn—on August 12, 2003; the acquisition was finalized on January 13, 2004.

Through a special arrangement, KERA announced plans to continue carrying programming sourced from the station over KDTN's digital signal, in order to free up bandwidth on KERA's main digital signal to allow the station to begin transmitting high definition content on digital channel 13.1. This has never been utilized as improvements in multiplexing technology have allowed a high definition channel to exist with standard definition channels, and KERA has had no need to use KDTN's bandwidth.

Digital television

Digital channels
The station's digital signal is multiplexed:

Analog-to-digital conversion
In 2003, KERA-TV signed on its digital signal on UHF channel 14. The station shut down its analog signal, over VHF channel 13, on June 12, 2009, the official date in which full-power television stations in the United States transitioned from analog to digital broadcasts under federal mandate. The station's digital signal remained on the UHF channel 14 allocation it used during the transition period. Through the use of PSIP, digital television receivers display the station's virtual channel as its former VHF analog channel 13.

Translators

Wichita Falls

Prior to the sign-on of the station's Wichita Falls translator, KERA had maintained a unique arrangement to distribute its programming to northwest Texas and southwestern Oklahoma, which was one of the few areas of the United States that did not have a PBS member station of its own. Wichita Falls Educational Translator, Inc. group headed by longtime State Representative Ray Farabee launched KIDZ-TV on UHF channel 24 on November 13, 1973; the station maintained a full-power license, but operated at an effective radiated power of only 2.82 kilowatts, producing a signal that had limited coverage propagation from the transmitter equivalent to that of many low-power stations. Before the expansion of cable television into the area, the goals were simple; among them, to make the popular children's program Sesame Street available to viewers in Wichita Falls (at the time, it was standard for PBS to offer programs to commercial stations in areas that did not have public television service; but for unknown reasons, none of the three commercial stations in the Wichita Falls-Lawton market—NBC affiliate KFDX-TV (channel 3), CBS affiliate KAUZ-TV (channel 6) or ABC affiliate KSWO-TV (channel 7)—were interested). The local group had planned to apply for and build a translator to extend the KIDZ signal into the area. At the time, translators were only allowed to use signals picked up off the air, and KERA's signal was marginal at best in that part of North Texas.

KIDZ-TV shared tower space with KAUZ-TV, with the transmitter rebroadcasting KERA-TV's programming during the hours that KAUZ when was broadcasting, roughly between 6:00 a.m. and midnight. This meant that some specials that KERA aired on weekend evenings were interrupted before their conclusion when the KAUZ engineers (who tended channel 24 as a public service) switched off the transmitters for the night and went home.

By the late 1970s, the FCC updated its broadcast translator regulations to allow a microwave relay to be used to feed programming transmissions to the translator station. KERA was therefore able to build its own translator in Wichita Falls, also on channel 24, as K24AD. The translator provided a better signal quality and could operate throughout KERA's designated broadcast hours. The repeater moved to UHF channel 44 in 2005, at which point it changed its call sign to K44GS. In September 2009, the FCC granted a construction permit to North Texas Public Broadcasting to convert K44GS to digital transmissions; the permit remained valid until September 2012 (the current occupant of channel 24, K24HH-D, is unrelated to K24AD or the earlier KIDZ-TV). In summer of 2018, the callsign changed to K26NK-D.

(The KJTL tower was able to remain standing in the strong winds, as the vandal had cut only two wires on that facility.) The translator remained off the air until May 6, 2021, when KERA restored service to K26NK-D on a separate tower north of Seymour Highway (near the Burlington Northern Santa Fe rail line) in southwestern Wichita Falls.

Tyler
In October 2009, North Texas Public Broadcasting filed an application with the FCC for a license to operate a KERA translator in Tyler. The license application requested for the translator to operate on UHF channel 25. The application was dismissed in March 2011. Two additional applications are still pending for repeaters on UHF channels 35 and 44, but no apparent actions have been taken on these applications to date.

Other services

Education and community engagement

KERA maintains several digital resources available for use by local schools and organizations serving children and families across North Texas. "Ready for Life" is a multimedia initiative that provides resources for parents, teachers and caregivers to prepare school-age children to live healthy and socially enriched lives, offering training modules on temperament, attachment and socialization, early literacy and nutrition and fitness; a 60-minute documentary; books; and Spanish-language materials.

The "Summer Learning Challenge" is an annual initiative targeted at families and organized with participating North Texas nonprofits. Participants are required to complete a series of online PBS-related activities and challenges, while families are encouraged to read books, prepare recipes and take part in KERA-recommended summer activities together.

In March–April 2016, KERA held the Dallas-Fort Worth iteration of the Cyberchase Step It Up! program, in partnership with the Boys & Girls Club of Greater Fort Worth and the Blue Zones Project, which was designed to inspire kids and educators to find opportunities to work more steps in their regular day while learning about math. In June 2016, KERA hosted and sponsored an event at the Trinity River Audubon Center (TRAC) for 120 children from lower-income and immigrant families, in which participants engaged in educational activities centered around the Trinity River.

KERA also hosts various screenings related to television programs and focused on community engagement. In the fall of 2016, KERA hosted two screenings of the documentary Willie Velásquez: Your Vote is Your Voice. In March 2016, KERA partnered with the Texas Rangers Baseball Foundation to present two screenings of the Ken Burns documentary Jackie Robinson, which chronicled the life and contributions of the first African American to play in Major League Baseball. In April 2017, KERA hosted a screening for Burns' multi-part documentary film, The Vietnam War.

Digital platforms

KERA Passport
KERA Passport is a localized version of the PBS Passport video-on-demand service that offers expansive access to video content for KERA member donors who contribute $60 or more annually or at least $5 in ongoing monthly donations to KERA-TV and KERA radio. Introduced in 2016, KERA Passport allows members to save shows available for streaming on the platform to a watchlist, view archived programs (such as Downton Abbey, NOVA, Call the Midwife, Austin City Limits, Frontline and American Masters), and watch favorited programs online and through the PBS Passport app.

Tellyspotting
Tellyspotting is a blog operated by KERA that provides news about British television series (many of which – specifically those aired as part of the PBS wheel series Masterpiece, such as Victoria and Sherlock – are carried by KERA-TV, or its traditional block of Britcoms), detailing new and upcoming programs, and news and articles about British-originated programs aggregated from around the Internet.

Programming
As a PBS member station, much of KERA's programming consists of educational and entertainment programming distributed by PBS to its member stations, which include NOVA, the PBS NewsHour, Antiques Roadshow, Arthur, Frontline, Masterpiece, Daniel Tiger's Neighborhood, Nature and Sesame Street. While there is cross-promotion between KERA-TV and the KERA and KKXT radio stations, the radio properties conduct pledge drives independent of those conducted by channel 13.

KERA airs children's programming from PBS and American Public Television on its main feed each Monday through Friday from 6:00 a.m. to 6:00 p.m., as well as 24 hours a day on its PBS Kids-affiliated subchannel on digital channel 13.2. KERA has the second-largest audience average for children's programming among public television stations in the United States, with its programs reaching over 350,000 children each week.

Original and PBS-distributed programs produced by KERA

KERA has long contributed original programming for distribution to the nationwide PBS system and individual member stations, including documentaries such as JFK: Breaking the News and Matisse and Picasso, the latter of which earned the station an Emmy Award nomination. The station also produced the PBS documentary series The U.S. - Mexican War, which aired between 1995 and 2006.

Other programs from KERA's production department that have been distributed to public television stations throughout Texas and nationwide have included The Texas Debates, CEO (a monthly interview series hosted by Lee Cullum, airing on KERA television and radio, which features interviews with chief executives from the corporate and non-profit sectors in North Texas that inquires about how companies try to attain or maintain success in the current global marketplace, as well as leadership style and ethics) and The Can Cliburn: 50 Years of Gold. It also produces Frame of Mind, a series co-produced by KERA's Art&Seek unit and the Video Association of Dallas, which showcases independent films, documentaries and video shorts from Texas-based filmmakers.

News operation

KERA-TV became one of the earliest educational television stations in the U.S. to establish a news department on February 16, 1970, when it premiered Newsroom, a half-hour 6:00 p.m. newscast that aired Monday through Friday evenings, and was based on a similar program that aired on San Francisco PBS member station KQED. In October 1976, the program was relaunched as a half-hour prime time newscast under the title The 9 O'Clock Report, predating the move of then-independent station KTVT's late evening newscast to the 9:00 p.m. timeslot in August 1990. Within months of the change, channel 13 moved its evening newscast two hours earlier to 7:00 p.m. on January 31, 1977 (with the move, the program was briefly retitled as The 7 O'Clock Report, before becoming 13 Report the following month). KERA shut down its news department on September 21, 1977.

On-air staff

Notable former on-air staff
 Jerry Haynes – host of Mr. Peppermint (1970–1975; program was revamped version of former WFAA program Peppermint Place)
 Jim Lehrer – anchor of Newsroom (later anchor of the PBS NewsHour; died on January 23, 2020)

See also
 KERA (FM) – co-owned news/talk radio station
 KKXT – co-owned AAA radio station
 KDTN – former sister television station based in Denton, now a Daystar owned-and-operated station

References

 Shannon, Mike (January 2004). Dallas-Fort Worth TV Station History. ''The History of Dallas–Fort Worth Radio and Television.

External links
 
 KERA Kids website
 DFW Radio/TV History
“1977 National Women's Conference: A Question of Choices,”  1977-11-21,  The Walter J. Brown Media Archives & Peabody Awards Collection at the University of Georgia, American Archive of Public Broadcasting

Television stations in the Dallas–Fort Worth metroplex
PBS member stations
Television channels and stations established in 1960
1960 establishments in Texas